Eva Zeller (25 January 1923 – 5 September 2022) was a German poet and novelist.

Zeller was born in Eberswalde, Province of Brandenburg on 25 January 1923. She lived in the former East Germany until 1956, then lived for six years in Namibia, before returning to Germany.

Zeller was also credited as one of the authors of the text on the 1970 experimental music album, Klopfzeichen, by the Berlin-based trio Kluster. She died on 5 September 2022, at the age of 99.

Publications
Novels
 Lampenfieber (Stage Fright) (1974)
 Hauptfrau (The Head Woman) (1977)
 Solange ich denken kann. Roman einer Jugend (As Long as I can Think. Novel of a Childhood) (1981)
 Das versiegelte Manuskript 1998 English translation: The Manuscript 2000
Poetry
 Fliehkraft (The Strength to Flee) (1975)
 Auf dem Wasser gehen (Walking on Water) (1979)

Further reading
 Bloomsbury Guide to Women's Literature

References

1923 births
2022 deaths
People from Eberswalde
German expatriates in Namibia
German women novelists
German women poets
People from the Province of Brandenburg